The 1996–97 Toronto Maple Leafs season was Toronto's 80th season in the National Hockey League (NHL).

The Maple Leafs entered the 1996–97 NHL season with the hopes of making the playoffs for the fifth consecutive year. Mike Murphy was hired prior to the season as the head coach replacing interim coach Nick Beverley. The team played poorly for most of the season and missed the playoffs for the first time since 1992. This season would be Cliff Fletcher's last as general manager of the Maple Leafs. In one of his final moves, Fletcher traded captain Doug Gilmour to the New Jersey Devils in February.

Offseason

Regular season

Season standings

Schedule and results

Player statistics

Forwards
Note: GP= Games played; G= Goals; AST= Assists; PTS = Points; PIM = Points

Defencemen
Note: GP= Games played; G= Goals; AST= Assists; PTS = Points; PIM = Points

Goaltending
Note: GP= Games played; W= Wins; L= Losses; T = Ties; SO = Shutouts; GAA = Goals Against

Awards and records

Transactions
The Maple Leafs have been involved in the following transactions during the 1996–97 season.

Trades

Waivers

Free agents

Draft picks

Farm teams
The Maple Leafs farm team was the St. John's Maple Leafs, based in St. John's, Newfoundland.

References
 Maple Leafs on Hockey Database

Toronto Maple Leafs seasons
Toronto Maple Leafs season, 1996-97
Toronto